Skabo may refer to:

 Škabo (born 1976), Serbian hip hop musician
 Skabo Jernbanevognfabrikk, a Norwegian railroad car manufacturer
 Eivind Skabo (1916–2006), Norwegian sprint canoeist